Étienne Bâtard (died ) was a Mi'kmaq warrior from Miramichi, New Brunswick, Canada.

Bâtard fought in Father Le Loutre's War.  He participated in fighting the British in the Battle at Chignecto and the Attack at Jeddore.

References 
 

1760s deaths
Mi'kmaq people
Year of birth unknown
Year of death uncertain
18th-century indigenous people of the Americas
People of Father Le Loutre's War